In mathematical physics, global hyperbolicity is a certain condition on the causal structure of a spacetime manifold (that is, a Lorentzian manifold).  It's called hyperbolic because the fundamental condition that generates the Lorentzian manifold is
 
(t and r being the usual variables of time and radius) which is one of the usual equations representing an hyperbola.  But this expression is only true relative to the ordinary origin; this article then outline bases for generalizing the concept to any pair of points in spacetime.
This is relevant to Albert Einstein's theory of general relativity, and potentially to other metric gravitational theories.

Definitions 
There are several equivalent definitions of global hyperbolicity. Let M be a smooth connected Lorentzian manifold without boundary. We make the following preliminary definitions:
 M is non-totally vicious if there is at least one point such that no closed timelike curve passes through it.
 M is causal if it has no closed causal curves.
 M is non-total imprisoning if no inextendible causal curve is contained in a compact set. This property implies causality.
 M is strongly causal if for every point p and any neighborhood U of p there is a causally convex neighborhood V of p contained in U, where causal convexity means that any causal curve with endpoints in V is entirely contained in V. This property implies non-total imprisonment.
 Given any point p in M,  [resp. ] is the collection of points which can be reached by a future-directed [resp. past-directed] continuous causal curve starting from p.
 Given a subset S of M, the domain of dependence of S is the set of all points p in M such that every inextendible causal curve through p intersects S.
 A subset S of M is achronal if no timelike curve intersects S more than once.
 A Cauchy surface for M is a closed achronal set whose domain of dependence is M. 
The following conditions are equivalent:
 The spacetime is causal, and for every pair of points p and q in M, the space of continuous future-directed causal curves from p to q is compact in the  topology.
 The spacetime has a Cauchy surface.
 The spacetime is causal, and for every pair of points p and q in M, the subset  is compact.
 The spacetime is non-total imprisoning, and for every pair of points p and q in M, the subset  is contained in a compact set (that is, its closure is compact).
If any of these conditions are satisfied, we say M is globally hyperbolic. If M is a smooth connected Lorentzian manifold with boundary, we say it is globally hyperbolic if its interior is globally hyperbolic.

Other equivalent characterizations of global hyperbolicity make use of the notion of Lorentzian distance   where the supremum is taken over all the  causal curves connecting the points (by convention d=0 if there is no such curve). They are
 A non-total imprisoning spacetime such that  is continuous for every metric choice in the conformal class of the original metric.

Remarks 
Global hyperbolicity, in the first form given above, was introduced by Leray in order to consider well-posedness of the Cauchy problem for the wave equation on the manifold. In 1970 Geroch proved the equivalence of  definitions 1 and 2. Definition 3 under the assumption of strong causality and its equivalence to the first two was given by Hawking and Ellis.

As mentioned, in older literature, the condition of causality in the first and third definitions of global hyperbolicity given above is replaced by the stronger condition of strong causality.  In 2007, Bernal and Sánchez showed that the condition of strong causality can be replaced by causality. In particular, any globally hyperbolic manifold as defined in 3 is strongly causal. Later Hounnonkpe and Minguzzi proved that for quite reasonable spacetimes, more precisely those of dimension larger than three which are non-compact or non-totally vicious,  the 'causal' condition can be dropped from definition 3. 

In definition 3 the closure of  seems strong (in fact, the closures of the sets   imply causal simplicity, the level of the causal hierarchy of spacetimes   which stays just below global hyperbolicity). It is possible to remedy this problem strengthening the causality condition as in  definition 4 proposed by Minguzzi in 2009. This version clarifies that global hyperbolicity sets a compatibility condition between the causal relation and the notion of compactness: every causal diamond is contained in a compact set and every inextendible causal curve escapes compact sets. Observe that the larger the family of compact sets the easier for  causal diamonds to be contained on some compact set but the harder for causal curves to escape compact sets. Thus global hyperbolicity sets a balance on the abundance of compact sets in relation to the causal structure. Since finer topologies have less compact sets we can also say that the balance is on the number of open sets given the causal relation.
Definition 4 is also robust under perturbations of the metric (which in principle could introduce closed causal curves). In fact using this version it has been shown that global hyperbolicity is stable under metric perturbations.

In 2003, Bernal and Sánchez showed that any globally hyperbolic manifold M has a smooth embedded three-dimensional Cauchy surface, and furthermore that any two Cauchy surfaces for M are diffeomorphic. In particular, a globally hyperbolic manifold is foliated by Cauchy surfaces.

In view of the initial value formulation for Einstein's equations, global hyperbolicity is seen to be a very natural condition in the context of general relativity, in the sense that given arbitrary initial data, there is a unique maximal globally hyperbolic solution of Einstein's equations.

See also 
 Causality conditions
 Causal structure
 Light cone

References 

 
 

General relativity
Mathematical methods in general relativity